Ulises Humala Tasso (born 2 March 1959 in Lima) is a Peruvian professor at the Universidad Nacional de Ingeniería and a politician who ran unsuccessfully for president in the 2006 election on the Avanza País ticket. He was running against his brother, Ollanta Humala, and 18 other candidates. Ulises received 0.2% of the vote, coming in 14th place.

Like his brother Ollanta, Ulises Humala considers himself to be a nationalist.  However, he claims to be less radical.  He also considers the current 1993 constitution, produced in the "Democratic Constitutional Congress" after Alberto Fujimori's self-coup and during the Peruvian Constitutional Crisis of 1992, to be illegal.

One of his other brothers, Antauro Humala, went to prison for leading a failed military rebellion. and currently is one of the main candidates for the upcoming presidential elections. The other brother, Ollanta Humala, served as the 65th President of Peru.

References

Ulises
Living people
Peruvian politicians of Quechua descent
Go on Country politicians
Candidates for President of Peru
Peruvian people of Italian descent
1959 births